B12 are a British electronic music duo consisting of Mike Golding and Steve Rutter. First appearing in the early 1990s under a variety of monikers, including Musicology, Redcell and Cmetric, the duo were often mistaken as hailing from Detroit, their sound being comparable to the so-called second wave of Detroit techno. This was compounded by the signature style of their initial releases on their own imprint B12 Records, limited editions on coloured 12" vinyl with cryptic messages etched into the run-out grooves, and the fact that Golding and Rutter tended to shy away from the press, and rarely gave interviews, which added to the mystery of their identities.

Their sound is usually categorised as techno, ambient techno, and IDM. Recurring themes of science fiction and futurism can be found in nearly all B12 releases and track names.

Career
Golding and Rutter met in the late 1980s through a mutual appreciation of the techno sound coming out from Detroit from artists such as Juan Atkins and Derrick May. Upon seeing the success of Plus 8 Records in early 1990, they were inspired to do the same, and in 1991 founded B12 Records as an outlet for the music they and their friends Kirk Degiorgio (a.k.a. As One), and Steve Pickton (a.k.a. Stasis), were producing. Writing under various monikers they released a series of 12" vinyl records, each with a limited run of coloured vinyl, and messages hand-etched into the run-out grooves.

In 1992, B12 appeared on the Rephlex CD The Philosophy of Sound and Machine, and the seminal Warp Records Artificial Intelligence Volume I compilation, alongside Aphex Twin, Autechre, The Black Dog, and Richie Hawtin. A full-length album Electro-Soma followed in 1993, a compilation of tracks from early B12 Records releases, as part of Warp's continuing Artificial Intelligence series.

B12 continued to release records on their own imprint, and also released a pair of split releases in conjunction with 'A.R.T. (Applied Rhythmic Technology)', a label run by their friend Kirk Degiorgio.

In 1996 their second full length Time Tourist was released on Warp, with artwork by The Designers Republic, featuring a painting by Trevor Webb of a futuristic London. The album contained mostly new material, although the track "Scriptures" had been previously released in 1994 on the Artificial Intelligence II compilation.

Both Electro-Soma and Time Tourist were re-released in the United States on the Wax Trax!/TVT label.

Also in 1996, B1215 (the unlucky 13th release on B12 – cat. numbers 12 and 13 were never used) was pressed, but only a handful of white label promo copies were ever released. This was to be the last release on B12 Records for over a decade. Due to the limited numbers pressed of each release, original B12 vinyl is sought after by collectors and can change hands for large amounts of money.

In 1998, 3EP was released on Warp Records, a tribute to Jazz musicians Dave Brubeck, Joe Morello, and Ron Carter (each track was named after them). The EP was not released in the United States. After 3EP's release, B12 retracted from public space without explanation, and were not heard of or seen again until 2005.

A number of poor-quality illegal bootlegs of old B12 material began circulating in late 2004, claiming to be represses. Obviously not cut from the original plates (they were missing the etched messages in the run-out grooves), it is thought they were probably taken from recordings of the old vinyl, or ripped from CD. Whether or not this was the reason B12 reappeared is not known.

In 2005, Golding and Rutter announced they were restarting B12 Records, and would be making available the complete back catalogue, remastered, on a 12 disc CD box set. They began playing live shows again, and a new Redcell track, titled "Back From The Edge" appeared on a limited CD series on Seed Records.

In June 2007, the full release of 1996's B1215 and new material B1216 was announced, staying with the limited edition coloured vinyl format with etched messages in the run out grooves.

In May 2008, B12 released their third album (their first album in 12 years) called Last Days of Silence.

Discography

References

External links
 b12records.com – official B12 Records website
 obsolete.com/b12 – old B12 Records website
 
 

Intelligent dance musicians
British techno musicians
British electronic music groups
Electronic music duos
British electronic musicians
Musical groups established in 1990